Human is the debut EP released by singer-songwriter Darren Criss. Criss independently produced the EP and it was released digitally on July 20, 2010. The EP reached No. 17 on Billboards Top Heatseekers chart. As of April 2013, the EP has sold 27,000 copies in the United States, according to Nielson SoundScan.

Album information

Background
Criss describes that he put off making an EP for a long time because he is a perfectionist, which is why he prefers people to see him play live. Criss recorded the EP in his room in about a week with an audio engineer friend of his. Criss states that each of the songs are "old songs", adding that "Human" was the first song he wrote, back when he was 15. The songs "Sami" and "Not Alone" appeared in the StarKid Productions musical A Very Potter Musical, but Criss had written them beforehand. He wrote "Not Alone" while abroad in Italy and wrote "Sami" for the web series Little White Lie that he and other members of StarKid had done in 2007.

Sound
Criss finds his music tough to categorize into a certain genre, but stated that he liked the term "soul-folk".

Track listing

Personnel
 Darren Criss – vocals, guitar
 Chris Lorentz – producer, mixing, mastering
 Forest Casey – CD and cover photography
 Frank Franco III – CD and cover layout design

Charts

Other appearances
 "Sami" was originally written for the web series Little White Lie and was later used in the StarKid Productions musical A Very Potter Musical with the name "Sami" changed to "Harry" and sung by Ginny Weasley (Jaime Lyn Beatty). The Human version of "Sami" also appears on A Very StarKid Album.
 "Not Alone" was also used in the StarKid Productions musical A Very Potter Musical. The Human version of "Not Alone" also appears on A Very StarKid Album.

References

2010 debut EPs
Darren Criss EPs